The 2006 Major League Baseball postseason was the playoff tournament of Major League Baseball for the 2006 season. The winners of the League Division Series would move on to the League Championship Series to determine the pennant winners that face each other in the World Series.

In the American League, the New York Yankees made their twelfth straight postseason appearance, the Minnesota Twins returned for the fourth time in five years, the Oakland Athletics returned for the fourth time in seven years, and the Detroit Tigers ended almost two decades of futility by clinching their first postseason berth since 1987.

In the National League, the St. Louis Cardinals returned for the third straight year, the New York Mets returned for the second time in seven years, the Los Angeles Dodgers returned for the second time in three years, and the San Diego Padres made their second straight postseason appearance.

This was the first postseason since 1990 to not feature the Atlanta Braves, who had previously made fourteen straight appearances from 1991 to 2005.

The postseason began on October 3, 2006, and ended on October 27, 2006, with the 83-win underdog Cardinals upsetting the heavily-favored Tigers in five games in the 2006 World Series. It was the Cardinals' first title since 1982 and their tenth overall.

Playoff seeds
The following teams qualified for the postseason:

American League
 New York Yankees – AL East champions, AL regular season champions, 97–65
 Minnesota Twins – AL Central champions, 96–66
 Oakland Athletics – AL West champions, 93–69
 Detroit Tigers – 95–67

National League
 New York Mets – NL East champions, NL regular season champions, best record in baseball, 97–65
 San Diego Padres – NL West champions, 88–74 (13–5 head-to-head record vs. LAD)
 St. Louis Cardinals – NL Central champions, 83–78
 Los Angeles Dodgers – 88–74 (5–13 head-to-head record vs. SD)

Playoff bracket

American League Division Series

(1) New York Yankees vs. (4) Detroit Tigers 

†: Game was postponed due to rain on October 4

This was the first postseason meeting between the Yankees and Tigers. The Tigers defeated the Yankees in four games to advance to the ALCS for the first time since 1987. It was the first playoff series win by the Tigers since the 1984 World Series.

Games 1 and 2 were split by both teams - the Yankees won Game 1 by an 8-4 score, while the Tigers evened the series with a narrow comeback victory in Game 2. When the series shifted to Detroit for Game 3, the Tigers shut out the Yankees 6-0, and then blew out the Yankees in Game 4 to advance.

The Tigers and Yankees would meet in the postseason twice more, in the 2011 ALDS and 2012 ALCS, both won by the Tigers.

(2) Minnesota Twins vs. (3) Oakland Athletics 

This was the second postseason meeting between the Athletics and Twins. They previously met in the 2002 ALDS, which was won by the Twins. The Athletics swept the Twins to return to the ALCS for the first time since 1992. In Minneapolis, the Twins were held to two runs in each of the first two games as the Athletics went up 2-0 in the series headed to Oakland. The Athletics blew out the Twins in Game 3 to advance to the ALCS.

This was the last time the Athletics won a playoff series until 2020. The Twins would not return to the postseason again until 2009.

National League Division Series

(1) New York Mets vs. (4) Los Angeles Dodgers 

This was the first postseason meeting between the Mets and Dodgers since the 1988 NLCS, which was won by the Dodgers in seven games. The Mets swept the Dodgers to return to the NLCS for the first time since 2000. Both teams would meet again in the 2015 NLDS, which the Mets also won.

(2) San Diego Padres vs. (3) St. Louis Cardinals 

In the third postseason meeting between these two teams, the Cardinals once again defeated the Padres, this time in four games, to return to the NLCS for the third straight time. The Padres would not return to the postseason again until 2020.

American League Championship Series

(3) Oakland Athletics vs. (4) Detroit Tigers 

This was a rematch of the 1972 ALCS, which the Athletics won in five games en route to a World Series title. The Tigers swept the Athletics to advance to the World Series for the first time since 1984, capped off by a walk-off three-run home run by Magglio Ordóñez in the bottom of the ninth inning of Game 4 (in the process denying a rematch of either the 1931 or 1973 World Series). As of 2022, this is the last time the Athletics appeared in the ALCS, and the only time the Athletics appeared in the ALCS during the "Moneyball" era. The Tigers and Athletics would meet two more times in the postseason, in the ALDS in 2012 and 2013, both won by the Tigers in five games.

The Tigers would win their next AL pennant in 2012, by sweeping the New York Yankees.

National League Championship Series

(1) New York Mets vs. (3) St. Louis Cardinals 

†: Game 1 was postponed due to rain on October 11. Game 2 was subsequently pushed back a day as well.
‡: Game 5 was postponed due to rain on October 16.

This was a rematch of the 2000 NLCS, which the Mets won in five games en route to the World Series. The Cardinals defeated the Mets in seven games to return to the World Series for the second time in three years (in the process denying a rematch of the 1973 World Series).

In Queens, the first two games were split by both teams. When the series moved to St. Louis for Game 3, the Cardinals shut out the Mets by a 5-0 score to go up 2-1 in the series. The Mets then responded with a blowout win in Game 4, and then the Cardinals responded by winning Game 5 to go up 3-2 in the series going back to Queens. The Mets won Game 6 by a 4-2 score to force a seventh game, which the Cardinals would win by a 3-1 score, capped off by a 2-run home run by Yadier Molina in the top of the ninth inning of Game 7, which put the Cardinals in the lead for good. Game 7 was the last postseason game ever played at Shea Stadium.

The Mets would make their next postseason appearance in 2015, where they reached the NLCS and swept the Chicago Cubs before falling in the World Series. The Cardinals would win their next NL pennant in 2011 over the Milwaukee Brewers in six games.

2006 World Series

(AL4) Detroit Tigers vs. (NL3) St. Louis Cardinals 

†: Game 4 was postponed due to rain on October 25, forcing Game 5 to be subsequently pushed back a day as well.

This was the third World Series matchup between the Tigers and Cardinals. They had previously met in 1934 and 1968, with the Cardinals winning the former and the Tigers winning the latter. Like in 1968, the Tigers were once again down 3-1 in the series, however history would not repeat itself. The 83-win Cardinals finished an improbable upset of the heavily-favored Tigers in Game 5 to win their first World Series title since 1982. It was the first championship for St. Louis since 2000, when the Rams won Super Bowl XXXIV.

In Detroit for Game 1, the Cardinals shocked the Tigers with a 7-2 victory. Game 2 was marred by controversy, as the Tigers’ Kenny Rogers was suspected of using pine tar. Rogers claimed it was a combination of dirt and rosin (both legal), but complied with umpire requests to wash his hands. The Tigers would win Game 2 by a 3-1 score to tie the series. When the series moved back to St. Louis for Game 3, the Cardinals shut out the Tigers 5-0, and in Game 4, the Cardinals overcame a late Tigers lead in the bottom of the seventh to go up 3-1 in the series. The Cardinals then took Game 5 by a 4-2 score, pulling off one of the biggest upsets in World Series history. 

The Cardinals would return to the World Series again in 2011 where they defeated the Texas Rangers in seven games.  The Tigers wouldn't return to the postseason again until 2011. The Tigers would return to the World Series in 2012, but were swept by the San Francisco Giants.

To date, this is the last time the Tigers won a game in the World Series.

References

External links
 League Baseball Standings & Expanded Standings - 2006

 
Major League Baseball postseason